Temnora sardanus is a moth of the family Sphingidae. It is known from forests and heavy woodland from Sierra Leone to Congo and Angola, then to Zimbabwe and East Africa.

The length of the forewings is 19–21 mm for males and 23–25 mm for females. The apex of the forewings is acute. The body is dark grey and the thorax has a prominent crest. There is also a dark dorsal spot on the last abdominal segment. The forewings are dark grey with numerous faint, irregular transverse lines. There is a large dark brown triangle with its base resting on the costa and its apex at the tornus. The proximal margin is well defined and somewhat curved and the distal side is straight and diffuse. The hindwings are uniform greyish brown, with a paler spot at tornus. The abdominal tufts are light red. Females have broader, more rounded wings. The ground colour is darker and the dark markings are more diffuse and less distinct.

Subspecies
Temnora sardanus sardanus
Temnora sardanus canui Darge, 1991 (São Tomé & Princípe)
Temnora sardanus hirsutus Darge, 2004 (Tanzania)

References

Temnora
Moths described in 1856
Moths of Sub-Saharan Africa
Lepidoptera of the Democratic Republic of the Congo
Lepidoptera of Uganda
Lepidoptera of West Africa
Lepidoptera of Angola
Insects of the Central African Republic
Lepidoptera of the Republic of the Congo
Lepidoptera of Gabon
Lepidoptera of Tanzania
Lepidoptera of Zimbabwe